10/1 may refer to:
October 1 (month-day date notation)
January 10 (day-month date notation)